Catching Rays on Giant is the sixth studio album by German synth-pop band Alphaville, released in Europe on 19 November 2010.

Track listing

Charts

Weekly charts

References

2010 albums
Alphaville (band) albums